Miami Jackson Senior High School, also known as Andrew Jackson High School or Jackson High School, is a high school located at 1751 NW 36th Street in the Allapattah neighborhood of Miami, Florida, United States.  Its athletic team name is the Generals.

History

Jackson High School began as a grade school.  The original building was a log cabin built in 1898 on land donated by L.J. Becker. In its first year there were only 14 students.

It was replaced by a four-room grade school which was more than doubled later with the addition of a five-room annex.  Due to the growth of Miami's northwestern section, more rooms had to be added. In 1926, a three-story high school building was added. This building remained the Jackson High School main campus until 2008, when a new campus was built on the school's athletic fields; the original building was demolished and its area used for the new athletic fields. Jackson's renovation was a part of a program to rebuild all high schools in Miami-Dade County, and was the second school to be rebuilt after Miami Beach High School. The former building was the third-oldest high school building in Miami-Dade County, Florida after Beach High and the historical campus at Miami High School. The tenth grade was added in 1936, and by 1939 the eleventh and twelfth grades were added. By then, the elementary grades had been dropped. Jackson's first graduating class had 79 students.

Demographics

Miami Jackson High is 67% Hispanic, 32% Black and 1% White non-Hispanic.

Academics 

The State's Accountability program grades a school by a complex formula that looks at both current scores and annual improvement on the Reading, Math, Writing and Science FCATs.

The school's grades by year since the FCAT began in 1998 are:

 1998-99: D
 1999-00: D
 2000-01: D
 2001-02: F (259 points)
 2002-03: F (259 points)
 2003-04: F (270 points)
 2004-05: D (289 points)
 2005-06: F (272 points)
 2006-07: D (397 points)
 2007-08: C (407 points)
 2008-09: F (390 points)
 2009-10: D (825 points)
 2010-2011: A (1,056 points)
 2011-2012: A
 2012-2013: B
 2013-2014: B (1041 points)
 2014-2015: C
 2015-2016: C
 2016-2017: C

Notable alumni

Actors and entertainers 
 Edward Muscare - Class of 1951; television and YouTube personality
Angela Pitts - Class of 2002; contestant on Flavor of Love 3; best known as Myamee; winner of I Love Money 2
Andrew Prine - Class of 1954; veteran film, stage and television actor, with over 150 movies and TV episodes to his credit
 Bob Vila - Class of 1962; host of television's This Old House
 Constance Weldon - Class of 1950; America's first female professional tubist

Artists 

 Firelei Báez

Military 
Manuel J. "Pete" Fernandez - Class of 1943; Korean War ace, 14 kills

Sports

Basketball
 Mychal Thompson - Class of 1974; 33-0 State Championship team (stripped of title by the FHSAA for using four ineligible players); two-time NBA champion with Los Angeles Lakers; sports broadcaster

Baseball
 Warren Cromartie - Class of 1971; played in Major League Baseball with Montreal Expos (1974–1983) and Kansas City Royals (1991); also spent many years playing in Japan
 John Harris - Class of 1973; played in Major League Baseball with California Angels (1979-1981)
 Lenny Harris - played in Major League Baseball with Cincinnati Reds (1988–1989, 1994–1998), Los Angeles Dodgers (1989–1993), New York Mets (1998, 2000–2001), Colorado Rockies (1999), Arizona Diamondbacks (1999–2000), Milwaukee Brewers (2002), Chicago Cubs (2003) and Florida Marlins (2003–2005)
Fred Norman - Class of 1961; played 16 years in Major League Baseball (1962–80) with various teams, including Kansas City Athletics, Chicago Cubs, and Cincinnati Reds
 Rafael Palmeiro - Class of 1982; played in Major League Baseball with Chicago Cubs (1986–1988), Texas Rangers (1989–1993, 1999–2003) and Baltimore Orioles (1994–1998, 2004–2005); played collegiately at Mississippi State University
 Bobby Ramos - Class of 1974; played in Major League Baseball with Montreal Expos (1978, 1980–1981, 1983–1984) and New York Yankees (1982)
 Mandy Romero - Class of 1984; played in Major League Baseball from 1997 - 2003; drafted by Pittsburgh Pirates in 19th round of 1988 MLB amateur draft; also played for San Diego Padres and Colorado Rockies

Chess
Ito Paniagua, Rodelay Medina, Gil Luna, Sedrick Roundtree and Marcel Martinez, whose 1998 National Championship was made into the 2020 motion picture Critical Thinking (film).

Football
Miami Jackson High football team is managed by Lakatriona Brunson.
 Joe Brodsky - Class of 1953; former NFL assistant coach
 Curry Burns - former NFL safety
 Lee Corso - Class of 1953; played collegiately at Florida State University; served as head coach of Indiana University and University of Louisville; now a broadcaster with ESPN
 Elvis Dumervil - Class of 2002; All-Pro linebacker in NFL, #92 for Denver Broncos
 Nick Ferguson - former NFL safety
Quinton Flowers - NFL running back for the Cincinnati Bengals
 John Edward Harris (1956- ) - safety, played 11 seasons for NFL's Seattle Seahawks and Minnesota Vikings; intercepted 50 passes in his career, second most in team history
 Cecil Johnson - former NFL linebacker
 Kenny Johnson - NFL running back with New York Giants (1979); played collegiately at University of Miami
 David Little - linebacker, played for University of Florida and 12 seasons for Pittsburgh Steelers
 Stefan Logan - running back in Canadian Football League; also played for Pittsburgh Steelers
 Joe McCall - former NFL running back
 Fred Robinson - NFL defensive lineman, linebacker, with San Diego Chargers (1984–1986) and Miami Dolphins (1986); played collegiately at University of Miami
 Mike Strachan - former NFL running back
 Elliott Walker - former NFL running back

Olympics
Manuel Huerta - Class of 2002; US 2012 Olympian in triathlon

See also
Miami-Dade County Public Schools
Education in the United States

References

External links
Official site

Allapattah
Miami-Dade County Public Schools high schools
1898 establishments in Florida
Educational institutions established in 1898